Darrell G "Bucky" Brandon (born July 8, 1940), is an American former professional baseball right-handed pitcher, who played in Major League Baseball (MLB) for the Boston Red Sox, Seattle Pilots, Minnesota Twins and Philadelphia Phillies. During a seven-year MLB career, Brandon compiled 28 wins, 354 strikeouts, and a 4.04 earned run average (ERA).

Brandon attended Nacogdoches High School in Texas and was signed as a free agent in 1959 by the Pittsburgh Pirates.

Once a heralded pitching prospect, Brandon was an undistinguished reliever throughout most of his career. In , his rookie season, he made 40 appearances  (17 starts) for Boston and finished 8–8 with a 3.31 ERA, a career-high 101 strikeouts, five complete games and two shutouts. On July 20, 1966, Brandon tossed a complete game, allowing one earned run on just two hits in a win over the California Angels. A year later, he divided his playing time between the expansion Seattle Pilots and Minnesota, and then spent the entire  season with the Triple-A Tucson Toros, in the Chicago White Sox farm system.

References

External links

Bucky Brandon at SABR (Baseball BioProject)
Bucky Brandon at Baseball Almanac
 Bucky Brandon at Pura Pelota (Venezuelan Professional Baseball League)

1940 births
Living people
American expatriate baseball players in Canada
American expatriate baseball players in Mexico
Baseball players from Texas
Boston Red Sox players
Denver Bears players
Dothan Cardinals players
Durham Bulls players
Eugene Emeralds players
Louisville Colonels (minor league) players
Major League Baseball pitchers
Mexican League baseball pitchers
Mineros de Coahuila players
Minnesota Twins players
Modesto Colts players
Oklahoma City 89ers players
People from Nacogdoches, Texas
Philadelphia Phillies players
Salem Rebels players
San Antonio Bullets players
Seattle Pilots players
Tiburones de La Guaira players
American expatriate baseball players in Venezuela
Toledo Mud Hens players
Tucson Toros players
Vancouver Mounties players
Winter Haven Super Sox players